Zimbabwe is a country in southern Africa.

Zimbabwe may also refer to:

 "Zimbabwe" (song), by Bob Marley & The Wailers
 Great Zimbabwe, an archeological site in southern Africa
 Zimbabwe Craton, Early Archaean lithology in southern Africa
 Zimbabwe (Dispatch album)
Zimbabwe (Assagai album)